Johannes Kichlefeldt (23 November 1901 – 24 June 1981) was an Estonian footballer who made 9 appearances for the Estonia national team between 1924 and 1926. After retiring from football in 1926, Kichlefeldt became a military officer and a policeman.

Early life
Kichlefeldt was born in Tallinn. He began playing football with a local youth team in Türi. After participating in the Estonian War of Independence, he joined VS Sport Tallinn.

Club career
Kichlefeldt played for VS Sport Tallinn in the inaugural season of the Meistriliiga. He also won the Meistriliiga in 1922, 1924, 1925.

International career
Kichlefeldt appeared 9 times for the Estonia national football team. He was on the Estonia Squad for the 1924 Summer Olympics, but did not appear in their only game, a 1–0 loss to the United States.

Kichlefeldt did not score a single goal for Estonia.

After Football
Kichlefeldt retired from football in 1926, at age 25, to become a military officer. After fighting in World War II, he became a police officer in the Estonian SSR.

Kichlefeldt died in 1981 at age 79, in Järvakandi.

Honours
Meistriliiga:(4)
1921, 1922, 1924, 1925

References

1901 births
1981 deaths
Footballers from Tallinn
Estonian footballers
Estonia international footballers
Association football forwards
Footballers at the 1924 Summer Olympics
Olympic footballers of Estonia